The Botswana Rugby Union is the governing body for rugby union in Botswana. It is a member of the Confederation of African Rugby (CAR) and a member of the International Rugby Board.

References

Sports governing bodies in Botswana
Rugby union governing bodies in Africa
Rugby union in Botswana